Daniel Birgmark (born 5 March 1973 in Gothenburg) is a sailor representing Sweden at Sailing at the 2008 Summer Olympics – Finn class and Sailing at the 2012 Summer Olympics – Finn class. He studied Marine Biology at the Gothenburg University in Sweden.

External links 
 Daniel Birgmark, SOK 

Olympic sailors of Sweden
Sailors at the 2004 Summer Olympics – Finn
Sailors at the 2012 Summer Olympics – Finn
Sportspeople from Gothenburg
1973 births
Swedish male sailors (sport)
Living people
Royal Gothenburg Yacht Club sailors